Germaine Bazzle (born March 28, 1932) is a jazz vocalist from New Orleans.

Background 
Bazzle was born in New Orleans in 1932 and is from the Seventh Ward. She grew up in a musical family and began playing the piano by ear at a young age. Her formal musical education began at the age of twelve at the Xavier Junior School of Music. Her musical influences include Sarah Vaughan, Ella Fitzgerald, and Billy Eckstein.

Career 
After graduating from the Xavier University of Louisiana Bazzle worked as a teacher, including as choir and music appreciation at Xavier Prep. She retired from teaching in 2008.

Since graduating from university Bazzle has been a performing musician. She has collaborated and performed with Red Tyler, Peter "Chuck" Badie, Victor Goines, George French, Ellis Marsalis, Emile Vinnette, Larry Siebert, and David Torkanowsky, along with their band Germaine Bazzle & Friends. She sang regularly with the Saint Louis Catholic Choir and The New World Ensemble. She has performed in New Orleans night clubs for over twenty years.

Bazzle is a supporter and faculty member of the Louis Armstrong Jazz Camp.

Discography 
Between 1985–1997 she participated in ten recording sessions as a vocalist and backing vocalist.

Albums

Guest appearances and collaborations

Awards 
In 2015, Bazzle received OffBeat'''s Lifetime Achievement in Music Education award. OffBeat'' also awarded her two Best of the Beat awards, Best Contemporary Jazz Vocalist in 1996 and Best Female Vocalist in 1997. In 1990, 1992, 1993, and 1994 she received the Big Easy Music Award for Best Female Performer.

References 

1932 births
Living people
20th-century African-American women singers
American women jazz singers
American jazz singers
Rounder Records artists
Jazz musicians from New Orleans
Singers from Louisiana
20th-century American singers
20th-century American women singers
21st-century American women singers
Xavier University of Louisiana alumni
African-American Catholics
21st-century African-American women singers